Pochinki is a rural locality (a selo) and the administrative center of Pochinkovsky District of Nizhny Novgorod Oblast, Russia. Population:

References

Rural localities in Nizhny Novgorod Oblast
Pochinkovsky District, Nizhny Novgorod Oblast
Lukoyanovsky Uyezd